Zhaleh Sameti (born 3 April 1972) is an Iranian actress.
She graduated from the Faculty of Fine Arts of the University of Tehran in the field of theater and began her professional career in 1974 with a role in "Det". When Did You See Sahar Last Time?? (2015) and Darkhongah (2018) has been nominated for Crystal Simorgh from Fajr Film Festival. She has also won the Hafez Award for Home and Underground TV Series (2020–present).
Sameti has been a judge in the Asre Jadid television competition since 2022.

Artistic life
She pursued her career by starring in the films Shadow to Shadow, Bat, The Last Battle, Deadly Escape, and Sweet Jam. She has also appeared in several TV series, including Yahya and Glabton, Land of Angels, Hotel, Evil Thought, Farrokh and Faraj Residential Complex, Friendship Agency, These Grounds and Underground.

Filmography
Dracula 
means girl
Purple Plain
Shadow to shadow
Bat 
Last Battle
Sweet jam
gilaneh
texas 2
Shishlik 
Darkhongah
Filicide 
Atmospheric station
Bad Friend
Hiran 
Instinct 
under ground

Awards 
Gol Agha Comedy Film Festival (Won) 
2019 Crystal Simorgh (Nominee) 
2016 Crystal Simorgh (Nominee) 
2019 Hafez Award     (Nominee)
2018 Hafez Awards    (Won)
2018 Shahr International Film Festival (Won) 
2021 Hafez Awards    (Won) 
The 14th Iranian Cinema Festival (Nominee)

References

«عاشقانه‌ها» با بازی شقایق فراهانی، ژاله صامتی و امیر عظیمی به صحنه می‌آید
https://www.sarpoosh.com/video-clips/art-cinema/zhaleh-sameti-asrejadid010109-film.html
https://filmspot.pt/artigo/os-filmes-da-semana-estreias-nos-cinemas-e-no-streaming-17-de-dezembro-de-2020-12175/
https://www.screendaily.com/reviews/diapason-busan-review/5143051.article
https://ifpnews.com/iranian-parliament-speaker-hails-young-man-for-his-art/
https://televezoon.com/actor/229/zhaleh-sameti.html
https://www.tvguide.com/celebrities/zhaleh-sameti/bio/3060015583/

External links
 
 
Namava 
Sameti In Filimo
Zhaleh Sameti in Persian Wikipedia



21st-century Iranian actresses
Living people
1972 births
Actresses from Tehran